The 1987 Michigan Wolverines football team was an American football team that represented the University of Michigan as a member of the Big Ten Conference during the 1987 NCAA Division I-A football season. In its 19th season under head coach Bo Schembechler, the team compiled an 8–4 record (5–3 against conference opponents), defeated Alabama in the Hall of Fame Bowl, outscored opponents by a total of 331 to 172, and was ranked No. 19 and No. 18, respectively, in the final AP and UPI polls.

The team's statistical leaders included quarterback Demetrius Brown with 1,251 passing yards, tailback Jamie Morris with 1,703 rushing yards and 90 points scored, and split end Greg McMurtry with 474 receiving yards.

Two Michigan players received first-team honors on the 1987 All-America college football team: offensive tackle Jumbo Elliott (consensus) and defensive lineman Mark Messner (The Sporting News). Five Michigan players received first-team honors on the 1987 All-Big Ten Conference football team.

Schedule

Game summaries

Notre Dame

Washington State

Long Beach State

Wisconsin

at Michigan State

Iowa

at Indiana

Northwestern

at Minnesota

at Illinois

Ohio State

vs. Alabama (Hall of Fame Bowl)

Jamie Morris 23 Rush, 234 Yds

Players

Roster

Offense
Geoffrey Bissell, wide receiver, senior, West Bloomfield, Michigan
Tony Boles, running back, sophomore, Westland, Michigan
Andrew Borowski, center, Cincinnati, Ohio
Demetrius Brown, quarterback, junior, Miami, Florida - started 10 games at quarterback
Jeffrey Brown, tight end, junior, Shaker Heights, Ohio - started all 12 games at tight end
Jarrod Bunch, running back, sophomore, Ashtabula, Ohio - started 9 games at fullback
Chris Calloway, wide receiver, sophomore, Chicago, Illinois - started 5 games at flanker
Bob Cernak, tight end, senior, Lockport, Illinois
Dave Chester, offensive guard, senior, Titusville, Florida - started 6 games at left offensive guard
Michael Dames, offensive guard, senior, Miami, Florida - started 6 games at left offensive guard
Doug Daugherty, offensive tackle, sophomore, Romeo, Michigan
Dave Dever, offensive guard, senior, Midland, Michigan
Dean Dingman, offensive guard, freshman, East Troy, Wisconsin
Tom Dohring, offensive tackle, sophomore, Dearborn, Michigan - started 6 games at left offensive tackle
Jumbo Elliott, offensive tackle, senior, Lake Ronkonkoma, New York - started all 12 games at right offensive tackle
Mark Erhardt, offensive tackle, senior, North Olmsted, Ohio
J. Patrick Fitzgerald, wide receiver, senior, Vandalia, Ohio
Leroy Hoard, fullback, sophomore, New Orleans, Louisiana - started 1 game at fullback
Mike Husar, offensive tackle, senior, Chicago, Illinois - started 6 games at left offensive tackle
Allen Jefferson, tailback, sophomore, Detroit, Michigan
John Kolesar, flanker, junior, Westlake, Ohio - started 7 games at flanker
Dave Mandel, tight end, senior, Ann Arbor, Michigan
Scott Mandel, tight end, senior, Ann Arbor, Michigan
Greg McMurtry, split end, sophomore, Brockton, Massachusetts - started all 12 games at split end
Keith Mitchell, tight end, junior, Southgate, Michigan
Jamie Morris, tailback, senior, Ayer, Massachusetts - started all 12 games at tailback
Marc Ramirez, center/guard, senior, Prairie View, Illinois
Greg Skrepenak, offensive tackle, freshman, Wilkes Barre, Pennsylvania
Michael Taylor, quarterback, junior, Lincoln Heights, Ohio - started 2 games at quarterback
John Vitale, center, senior, Detroit, Michigan - started all 12 games at center
Derrick Walker, tight end, junior, Glenwood, Illinois
Phil Webb, running back, senior, Romeo, Michigan - started 2 games at fullback
David Weil, offensive guard, junior, Cincinnati, Ohio
Tripp Welborne, wide receiver, freshman, Greensboro, North Carolina

Defense
Bobby Abrams, defensive back, junior, Detroit, Michigan - started 7 games at outside linebacker, 2 games at inside linebacker
David Arnold, defensive back, junior, Warren, Ohio - started 9 games at cornerback
Allen Bishop, defensive back, senior, Miami, Florida - started 8 games at cornerback
Ernest F. Bock, defensive back, senior, Northville, Michigan
Carlitos Bostic, outside linebacker, senior, Ypsilanti, Michigan
Erik Campbell, defensive back, senior, Gary, Indiana - started all 12 games (7 at cornerback, 5 at free safety)
Keith Cooper, outside linebacker, junior, Detroit, Michigan - started 4 games at outside linebacker, 3 games at inside linebacker
John Duerr, outside linebacker, senior, Dearborn, Michigan
Dave Folkertsma, defensive tackle, senior, Grand Rapids, Michigan
J. J. Grant, inside linebacker, junior, Liverpool, New York - started 7 games at inside linebacker
Mark Gutzwiller, defensive back, junior, Ann Arbor, Michigan
Billy Harris, middle guard, Xenia, Ohio - started 10 games at middle guard
Rick Hassel, defensive back, junior, Cincinnati, Ohio
Scott Herrala, defensive back, junior, Muskegon, Michigan
John Herrmann, defensive tackle, junior, Sussex, Wisconsin - started all 12 games at defensive tackle
Joseph H. Holland, outside linebacker, junior, Birmingham, Michigan
David Key, defensive back, sophomore, Columbus, Ohio
Sean Lafountaine, defensive back, sophomore, Hanover Park, Illinois
Don Lessner, defensive back, senior, Trenton, Michigan
Doug Mallory, strong safety, senior, DeKalb, Illinois - started all 12 games at strong safety
Warde Manuel, defensive tackle, sophomore, New Orleans, Louisiana - started 5 games at outside linebacker
Andree McIntyre, inside linebacker, senior, Chicago, Illinois - started 3 games at inside linebacker
Mark Messner, defensive tackle, senior, Hartland, Michigan - started all 12 games at defensive tackle
John Milligan, linebacker, sophomore, Trenton, Michigan - started 5 games at inside linebacker
Anthony Mitchell, defensive back, junior, Titusville, Florida - started 7 games at free safety
Vada Murray, defensive back, sophomore, Cincinnati, Ohio
T. J. Osman, defensive tackle, sophomore, Pittsburgh, Pennsylvania - started 2 games at middle guard
Cornelius Simpson, linebacker, freshman, Highland Park, Michigan - started 4 games at inside linebacker
Bob Stites, inside linebacker, senior, Ann Arbor, Michigan
Rick Stites, inside linebacker, senior, Ann Arbor, Michigan
Mike Teeter, middle guard, sophomore, Fruitport, Michigan
Steven Thibert, outside linebacker, senior, Union Lake, Michigan - started 2 games at outside linebacker
Brent White, defensive tackle, junior, Dayton, Ohio
Timothy Williams, linebacker, sophomore, Milwaukee, Wisconsin - started 1 game at inside linebacker
John Willingham, outside linebacker, senior, Dayton, Ohio - started 5 games at outside linebacker

Kickers
Mike Gillette, place-kicker, junior, St. Joseph, Michigan
Monte Robbins, punter, senior, Great Bend, Kansas
Rick Stukiewicz, place-kicker, senior, Troy, Michigan

Awards and honors
Captains: Jamie Morris, Doug Mallory
All-Americans: Jumbo Elliott, Mark Messner
All-Conference: Mark Messner, John Elliott, Jamie Morris, John Vitale, Mike Husar
Most Valuable Player: Jamie Morris
Meyer Morton Award: Jamie Morris
John Maulbetsch Award: Tim Williams
Frederick Matthei Award: Derrick Walker
Arthur Robinson Scholarship Award: Dave Mandel
Dick Katcher Award: Mark Messner
Hugh Rader Jr. Award: John "Jumbo" Elliott
Robert P. Ufer Award: Jamie Morris

Coaching staff
Head coach: Bo Schembechler
Assistant coaches: Alex Agase, Tirrel Burton, Cam Cameron, Lloyd Carr, Jerry Hanlon, Bill Harris, Jerry Meter, Les Miles, Gary Moeller, Tom Reed
Trainer: Russ Miller
Manager: Aaron Studwell (senior manager), Scott Boyle, Patrick Perkins, Bob McArdle

References

External links
  1987 Football Team -- Bentley Historical Library, University of Michigan Athletics History

Michigan
Michigan Wolverines football seasons
ReliaQuest Bowl champion seasons
Michigan Wolverines football